Sir John Derwentwater (died c. 1396), of Castlerigg, Cumbria and Ormside, Westmorland, was an English politician.

Family
Derwentwater was the son and heir of Sir John de Derwentwater of Castlerigg and Ormside, who died in 1366. Derwentwater married twice. His first wife's name is unrecorded, but they probably had one son. His second wife was Margaret née Strickland, who died long after Derwentwater, on 16 July 1449. She was the daughter and heiress of William Strickland, bishop of Carlisle and his wife, Isabel née Warcop, daughter of Thomas Warcop of Warcop, Westmorland. Derwentwater and Margaret had one daughter. Their daughter, Isabel, married Richard Restwold. Derwentwater was knighted by February 1371. The surname may have come from the place Derwentwater in their native Cumbria. Their main residence was on Lake Derwentwater.

Career
He was a Member (MP) of the Parliament of England for Westmorland in 1369 and 1386, and for Cumberland in 1379 and February 1388. He was Sheriff of Cumberland during the periods 7 November 1373 – 12 December 1374, 4 October 1375 – 26 October 1376 and 18 October 1380 – 1 November 1381.

References

14th-century births
1396 deaths
English MPs 1369
People from Keswick, Cumbria
People from Westmorland
English MPs 1379
English MPs 1386
English MPs February 1388
People from Eden District